Olimpiu Marin (born 6 March 1969) is a Romanian sports shooter. He competed in two events at the 1992 Summer Olympics.

References

1969 births
Living people
Romanian male sport shooters
Olympic shooters of Romania
Shooters at the 1992 Summer Olympics
Place of birth missing (living people)